Marko Jovanović (Serbian Cyrillic: Марко Јовановић; born 2 July 1989) is a Serbian football midfielder.

External links
 
 Marko Jovanović stats at utakmica.rs

1989 births
Living people
Sportspeople from Kragujevac
Serbian footballers
FK Loznica players
FK Jedinstvo Ub players
FK Radnički Klupci players
FK Smederevo players
FK Mačva Šabac players
Serbian SuperLiga players
FK Slavija Sarajevo players
Association football midfielders